Charles Mitchell Thomas (October 1, 1846 – July 3, 1908) was a rear admiral in the United States Navy who served for 47 years. He was briefly the Commander-in-Chief of the U.S. Atlantic Fleet while it was in port at San Francisco on the tour of the Great White Fleet. He was born in Philadelphia and graduated from the United States Naval Academy in 1865. He married Ruth Simpson, daughter of Admiral Edward Simpson, on November 3, 1874.

In mid-1877, unrest over economic conditions and the disputed 1876 Presidential election, led to a series of railroad strikes and riots known as the Great Railroad Strike of 1877. In July, President Rutherford B. Hayes authorized the use of the military to put down the strikes. During the conflict, Thomas was given temporary command of the receiving ship USS St. Louis stationed at League Island in Philadelphia. He provided sailors to the USS Glance and USS Pilgrim which were used in the defense of the Frankford Arsenal in northeast Philadelphia.

As a lieutenant commander he commanded the USC&GS Carlile P. Patterson from 1887 to 1889 for the U.S. Coast and Geodetic Survey, mapping out portions of the Alaska coast and naming prominent features in the south-east of the state. Thomas Bay, which he surveyed, was named in his honor.

During the sailing of the Great White Fleet, Thomas was second-in-command behind Admiral Evans. Shortly after the launch of the first leg, Evans fell ill and Thomas served in his stead at diplomatic functions during the cruise. Beginning in February 1908, Thomas was officially made acting-Commander-in-Chief when Evans was transported to San Francisco for treatment. On May 9, 1908 Evans was formally replaced by Thomas as Commander-in-Chief. Five days later, Thomas retired from active duty and command was transferred to Admiral Charles S. Sperry for the second leg of the voyage.

References

1846 births
1908 deaths
Military personnel from Philadelphia
United States Navy admirals